René Savary (born 12 October 1949) is a Swiss former cyclist. He competed in the team pursuit event at the 1972 Summer Olympics.

Major results
1971
 1st  Points race, National Track Championships
1972
 1st  Points race, National Track Championships
1975
 1st  Omnium, National Track Championships
 10th GP du canton d'Argovie
1976
 1st  Stayer, National Track Championships
 1st Tour du Nord-Ouest
 1st Stage 4b (ITT) Tour de Suisse
1977
 1st  Stayer, National Track Championships
1978
 1st  Stayer, National Track Championships
 1st Six Days of Zürich (with René Pijnen)
1979
 1st Stage 2 Tour de Suisse
 1st Stage 2 Deutschland Tour
 3rd Visp–Grachen

References

External links
 

1949 births
Living people
Swiss male cyclists
Olympic cyclists of Switzerland
Cyclists at the 1972 Summer Olympics
Sportspeople from the canton of St. Gallen
Swiss track cyclists
Tour de Suisse stage winners